Un fantastico via vai is a 2013 Italian comedy film directed by Leonardo Pieraccioni.

Cast
Leonardo Pieraccioni as Arnaldo
Serena Autieri as Anita
Maurizio Battista as Giovannelli
Marco Marzocca as Esposito
Marianna Di Martino as Camilla
Chiara Mastalli as Anna
Giuseppe Maggio as Marco
David Sef as Edoardo
Alice Bellagamba as Clelia
Massimo Ceccherini as Anna's father
Giorgio Panariello as Cavalier Mazzarra
Enzo Iacchetti as Monsignore
Alessandro Benvenuti as the man on the bus

References

External links

2013 films
Films directed by Leonardo Pieraccioni
Films set in Arezzo
2010s Italian-language films
2013 comedy films
Italian comedy films
2010s Italian films